Bartholomew Nicholas	Layton (born 1975) is an English documentary filmmaker. He is the writer and director of the films The Imposter and American Animals.

Early life and education
Both of his parents were artists, one a sculptor and the other a painter and theatre director. Early in his life, he considered going into film or being a painter.

Career

He made his directorial debut in 2012 with the true-crime story The Imposter. It is about Frédéric Bourdin, a French man who claimed to be a missing Texas teenager. Layton won a BAFTA for Outstanding Debut by a British Writer, Director or Producer for the film at the 2013 EE British Academy Film Awards.

He both wrote and directed American Animals. It depicts a 2004 book heist, with fictionalized versions and interviews with real people. Among the interviewees are the original criminals behind the heist. He had initially discovered the story in a magazine. The film was picked up by MoviePass.

In May 2018, he signed with the Creative Artists Agency.
 
As of 2018, Layton is the creative director of RAW, a British production company.

Filmography

Banged Up Abroad 
The Imposter (2012)
American Animals (2018)

Personal life
He lives with his family in London.

References

External links 
 
 

Living people
1975 births
British documentary film directors